Hasidut (from the , Sephardic pronunciation:  [ḥasidut]; Ashkenazic pronunciation:  [chasidus]; "piety" or "loving-kindness"), alternatively transliterated as hasiduth, may refer to:

 Hasidic Judaism - a branch of Orthodox Judaism, founded in 18th-century Eastern Europe by Rabbi Yisroel ben Eliezer (Baal Shem Tov) 
 Hasidic philosophy - the teachings, interpretations, and various practices of Judaism as articulated by the Hasidic movement
 List of Hasidic dynasties

See also
 Hasid (term)
 Hasideans
 Ashkenazi Hasidim

Hasidic Judaism
Hasidic thought
Jewish mysticism
Jewish theology
Hebrew words and phrases